Tyrone Douglas Cannon is the Clark L. Hull Professor of Psychology and Psychiatry at Yale University. His research focuses on neurobiological processes underlying psychological phenomena in people with mental illnesses, such as schizophrenia and bipolar disorder. Much of his research on schizophrenia and bipolar disorder has focused on developing approaches to prevent these disorders. A fellow of the Association for Psychological Science, he is the co-editor of the Annual Review of Clinical Psychology. He received the Joseph Zubin Memorial Fund Award from Columbia University's Department of Psychiatry in 2001.

References

External links
Faculty page

Living people
21st-century American psychologists
American psychiatrists
Schizophrenia researchers
Yale University faculty
University of Pennsylvania faculty
David Geffen School of Medicine at UCLA faculty
Dartmouth College alumni
University of Southern California alumni
Academic journal editors
Fellows of the Association for Psychological Science
Year of birth missing (living people)
Annual Reviews (publisher) editors